Serge Ravanel (12 May 1920 – 27 April 2009), born Serge Asher, was an engineer and author who became a prominent French Resistance fighter during World War II. He also operated under the alias Charles Guillemot.

Biography 
Asher was born in Paris, France on 12 May 1920. He was born to a wealthy family, of Jewish ancestry, his father an engineer and his mother a Czech fashion journalist, who had settled in Paris for work. His step-father was an export trader who worked in Africa.

Asher was educated at the Lycée Louis-le-Grand before going on to study polytechnics at École Polytechnique becoming an polyethnic engineer himself.

World War II 
By September 1942, encouraged by Vichy ineffectiveness in the face of Nazi occupation and his own communist views, he began working with Libération-sud as a courier. He also began organizing other students into resistance and would become a key figure in the Resistance's work to liberate Lyon. He would adopt the alias Serge Ravanel, based on an alpine mountaineer, while working with them, a name that he would keep for the rest of his life.

By November 1943 Ravanel was serving as the national head of the Mouvements Unis de la Résistance in the southern zone. He worked closely with Raymond Aubrac and Maurice Kriegel-Valrimont in Toulouse, directing so many attacks that the city would be described as 'Toulouse la rouge.'

In the summer of 1944, Ravanel would meet with de Gaulle and General Kœnig in Toulouse over the creation of the French Forces of the Interior (FFI). General Kœnig would grant Ravanel rank of colonel within the FFI. Despite receiving this promotion, Ravanel criticized the resistance group Corps Franc de la Montagne Noire on political grounds, opposing them due to his communist leanings. Ultimately Ravanel would recall his meeting with de Gaulle as humiliating, claiming it was a political stunt to reign in FFI officers while celebrating career ones, with de Gaulle questioning Ravanel's personal right to wear the ribbon of the Order of Liberation which Ravanel claimed had been awarded him earlier.

Ravanel resigned from the army in 1950.

Ravanel died on 27 April 2009 in Paris at the Val-de-Grâce military hospital.

Legacy 
Ravanel authored L'Esprit de Résistance, a biographical work describing his experience as a member of the French Resistance, which was published in 1995.

References 

1920 births
2009 deaths

Military personnel from Paris
Engineers from Paris
French male non-fiction writers
20th-century French male writers
Jews in the French resistance
Lycée Louis-le-Grand alumni
École Polytechnique alumni
Members of Liberation-Sud
Communist members of the French Resistance
French colonels